Milford Township is one of twelve townships in Dickinson County, Iowa, USA. As of the 2000 census, its population was 869.

Geography
According to the United States Census Bureau, Milford Township covers an area of 35.51 square miles (91.98 square kilometers). Of this, 35.46 square miles (91.85 square kilometers, 99.86 percent) is land, and 0.05 square miles (0.12 square kilometers, 0.13 percent) is water.

Cities, towns, villages
 Milford (east half)

Unincorporated towns
 Old Town at

Adjacent townships
 Center Grove Township (north)
 Richland Township (northeast)
 Lloyd Township (east)
 Lake Township, Clay County (southeast)
 Meadow Township, Clay County (south)
 Summit Township, Clay County (southwest)
 Okoboji Township (west)
 Lakeville Township (northwest)

Cemeteries
The township contains Milford Cemetery.

Major highways
  U.S. Route 71

Lakes
 Lower Gar Lake

School districts
 Okoboji Community School District
 Terril Community School District

Political districts
 Iowa's 5th congressional district
 State House District 06
 State Senate District 03

References
 United States Census Bureau 2007 TIGER/Line Shapefiles
 United States Board on Geographic Names (GNIS)
 United States National Atlas

External links

 
US-Counties.com
City-Data.com

Townships in Dickinson County, Iowa
Townships in Iowa